Charles Tappan Dunwell (February 13, 1852 – June 12, 1908) was a U.S. Representative from New York.

Born in Newark, New York, Dunwell moved with his parents to nearby Lyons in 1854. He attended the Lyons Union School. He entered Cornell University, Ithaca, New York, in the class of 1873, where he was a member of The Kappa Alpha Society. After the end of his junior year at Cornell, Dunwell entered Columbia Law School in the city of New York, and graduated in 1874.

He was admitted to the bar in 1874 and commenced practice in New York City.
In 1889, he began serving as general agent for the New York Life Insurance Company. He was an unsuccessful candidate for comptroller of the city of Brooklyn in 1890. Dunwell served as a member of the New York Republican State committee in 1891-92.

Dunwell was elected as a Republican to the Fifty-eighth, Fifty-ninth, and Sixtieth Congresses and served from March 4, 1903, until his death in Brooklyn, New York, June 12, 1908.
He was interred in The Evergreens Cemetery.

See also
List of United States Congress members who died in office (1900–49)

References

1852 births
1908 deaths
Columbia Law School alumni
Republican Party members of the United States House of Representatives from New York (state)
People from Brooklyn
People from Lyons, New York
19th-century American politicians